Andrei Vadimovich Zherdev (born 28 January 1989) is a Russian former professional football player.

Club career
He played in the Moldovan National Division for FC Zimbru Chișinău in 2013.

External links
 
 

1989 births
Sportspeople from Kaluga
Living people
Russian footballers
Association football midfielders
FC Zimbru Chișinău players
FC Dynamo Barnaul players
FC Lokomotiv Kaluga players
Moldovan Super Liga players
Russian expatriate footballers
Expatriate footballers in Moldova